WHUA-LP, UHF analog channel 44, was a low-powered Youtoo America-affiliated television station licensed to Chattanooga, Tennessee, United States. Founded on July 29, 1988 as W39AW, the station was owned by Ying Hua Benns. The station's lineup consisted of syndicated programs, special interest programs and local news.

W39AW changed its callsign to WYHB-LP in 1995; on January 11 of that year, they affiliated with The WB.

In 1999, WB programing moved to WFLI-TV (channel 53) on a secondary basis until 2001 when UPN programming was picked up by WYHB-LP. From that point on until May 1, 2006, the station was an affiliate of Urban America Television, when that network folded due to economic problems. After that, the station became an affiliate of America One and later Youtoo America (now YTA TV) when the former network merged with Youtoo TV in 2015.

The station also carried a part-time affiliation with UPN from 2000 to 2004, until that affiliation moved to CBS affiliate WDEF-TV (channel 12).

WYHB-LP closed and stopped broadcasting on July 31, 2017. The station changed its call sign to WHUA-LP on October 16, 2018, and the station's license was cancelled by the Federal Communications Commission on April 2, 2019. The station formerly had a construction permit to operate on digital channel 44.

HUA-LP
Television channels and stations established in 1990
1990 establishments in Tennessee
Defunct television stations in the United States
Television channels and stations disestablished in 2019
2019 disestablishments in Tennessee
HUA-LP